The Natchez Trace Parkway is a national parkway in the southeastern United States that commemorates the historic Natchez Trace and preserves sections of that original trail.  Its central feature is a two-lane road that extends 444 miles (715 km) from Natchez, Mississippi,  to Nashville, Tennessee.  Access to the parkway is limited, with more than fifty access points in the states of Mississippi, Alabama, and Tennessee.  The southern end of the route is in Natchez at its intersection with Liberty Road, and the northern end is northeast of Fairview, Tennessee, in the suburban community of Pasquo, at an intersection with Tennessee State Route 100.  In addition to Natchez and Nashville, larger cities along the route include Jackson and Tupelo, Mississippi, and Florence, Alabama.

Maintenance 
The road is maintained by the National Park Service and has been designated an All-American Road.

The Parkway is headquartered in Tupelo and has nine district offices: Leipers Fork, Meriwether Lewis, Cherokee, Tupelo, Dancy, Kosciusko, Ridgeland, Port Gibson, and Natchez. The Parkway also manages two battlefields: Brices Cross Roads National Battlefield Site and Tupelo National Battlefield.

History

Footpath

The gentle sloping and curving alignment of the current route closely follows the original foot passage. Its design harkens back to the way the original interweaving trails aligned as an ancient salt-lick-to-grazing-pasture migratory route of the American bison and other game that moved between grazing the pastures of central and western Mississippi and the salt and other mineral surface deposits of the Cumberland Plateau. The route generally traverses the tops of the low hills and ridges of the watershed divides from northeast to southwest.

Native Americans, following the "traces" of bison and other game, further improved this walking trail for foot-borne commerce between major villages located in central Mississippi and middle Tennessee.  The route is locally circuitous; however, by traversing this route the bison, and later humans, avoided the endless, energy-taxing climbing and descending of the many hills along the way.  Also avoided was the danger to a herd (or groups of human travelers) of being caught en-masse at the bottom of a hollow or valley if attacked by predators.  The nature of the route, to this day, affords good all-around visibility for those who travel it.  At all times the road is on the high ground of the ridge dividing the watersheds and provides a view to either see or catch the scent of danger, from a distance great enough to afford the time to flee to safety, if necessary.

By the time of European exploration and settlement, the route had become well known and established as the fastest means of communication between the Cumberland Plateau, the Mississippi River, and the Gulf of Mexico settlements of Pensacola, Mobile, and New Orleans.  In the early post-American Revolutionary War period of America's (south) westward expansion, the Trace was the return route for American flat-boat commerce between the territories of the upper and lower Ohio, Tennessee, and Cumberland River valleys. The Americans constructed flat-boats, loaded their commerce therein, and drifted upon those rivers, one-way south-southwestward to New Orleans, Louisiana.  They would then sell their goods (including the salvageable logs of the flat-boats and including enslaved people), and return home via the Trace (for the middle section of their return trip), to as far away as Pittsburgh, Pennsylvania.

Improved communications (steam boats, stagecoach lines, and railroads) and the development of ports along the rivers named above (e.g., Natchez; Memphis, Tennessee; Paducah, Kentucky; Nashville, Tennessee; and Louisville, Kentucky) made the route obsolete as a means of passenger and freight commerce. As a result, no major population centers were born or developed along the Trace, because of its alignment, between its termini Nashville and Natchez. The two cities of note, near or on the Trace's alignment (Jackson, Mississippi  and Tupelo, Mississippi), developed only as a result of their alignment along axes of communication different from the Trace.

Thus the Trace and its alignment are today almost entirely undeveloped and unspoiled along its whole route. Many sections of the original footpath are visible today for observing and hiking the Parkway's right-of-way.

The Natchez Trace National Scenic Trail includes five sections of hiking and horse riding trails.

Civilian Conservation Corps

Construction of the Parkway was begun by the federal government in the 1930s.  The development of the modern roadway was one of the many projects of the Civilian Conservation Corps during the Great Depression. The road was the proposal of U.S. Congressman T. Jeff Busby of Mississippi, who proposed it as a way to give tribute to the original Natchez Trace. Inspired by the proposal, the Daughters of the American Revolution began planting markers and monuments along the Trace. In 1934, the Franklin Delano Roosevelt administration ordered a survey. President Roosevelt signed the legislation to create the parkway on May 18, 1938.  Construction on the Parkway began in 1939, and the route was to be overseen by the National Park Service. Its length includes more than 45,000 acres (182 km2) and the towering Natchez Trace Parkway Bridge in Williamson County, Tennessee, completed in 1994 and one of only two post-tensioned, segmental concrete arch bridges in the world.

The Emergency Appropriations Act of June 19, 1934, allocated initial construction funds and established it as a parkway under National Park Service by the act of May 18, 1938.

Gaps and completion

For many years in the later 20th century, most of the trace had been complete but, owing to a lack of funds, two gaps remained, both in the state of Mississippi. One was a several-mile-long bypass of Jackson, between Interstate 55 at Ridgeland and Interstate 20 at Clinton. The other was between Liberty Road in the city of Natchez and U.S. Highway 61 near Washington. These final two segments were finally completed and opened on May 21, 2005.

In 2013 a new law required the National Park Service (NPS) to convey about 67 acres of property in the Natchez Trace Parkway to the State of Mississippi. It also adjusted the boundaries of the parkway to include 10 additional acres. The two pieces of land in question originally belonged to Mississippi and were donated to the National Park Service when the NPS was trying to determine where to end the Natchez Trace Parkway.

Historical sites

There are numerous historical sites on the Parkway, including the Meriwether Lewis Museum, the refurbished Mount Locust stand, Historic French Camp, MS, and the Mississippi Craft Center in Ridgeland, Mississippi, which focuses on promoting Mississippi's native art. Between the Parkway and Old Port Gibson Road is the ghost town of Rocky Springs that thrived in the late 19th century. The old Rocky Springs Methodist Church, the cemetery, and several building sites still exist and are accessible from the Parkway. Cypress Swamp is located at Mile Post 122. There are also several cascading waterfalls to view; for access, some require a bit of hiking from the parkway. Besides, parts of the original trail are still accessible. The history of the Natchez Trace, including the Parkway, is summarized at the Natchez Trace Visitor Center in Tupelo, Mississippi.

Emerald Mound, the second largest Native American ceremonial mound in the United States, is located just west of the Trace and north of Highway 61 near Natchez. It offers a unique look at the ingenuity and industry of native culture. Two smaller mounds rise from the top of the main mound and rise above treetops offering a wide view. Travelers can reach Emerald Mound with a five-minute detour from the main trace highway. The mound was built by depositing earth along the sides of a natural hill, thus reshaping it and creating an enormous artificial plateau.

The Ackia Battleground National Monument (established August 27, 1935 and now called Chickasaw Village) and Meriwether Lewis Park (proclaimed as Meriwether Lewis National Monument February 6, 1925 and transferred from the War Department August 10, 1933) were added to the parkway by the act of August 10, 1961.

Parkway highlights 
Highlights include:

Natchez to Jackson 
Milepost 10.3 Emerald Mound
15.5 Mount Locust
41.5 Sunken Trace
54.8 Abandoned Town of Rocky Springs

Jackson to Tupelo 
Milepost 105.6 Ross Barnett Reservoir Overlook
107.9 West Florida Boundary
122.0 Cypress Swamp
203.5 Historic settlement of Pigeon Roost
232.4 Bynum Mounds
261.8 Chickasaw Village Site

Tupelo to Tennessee state line 
Milepost 266 Natchez Trace Parkway Visitor Center
269.4 Old Trace
286.7 Pharr Mounds
327.3 Colbert Ferry, also site #12 on the North Alabama Birding Trail
330.2 Rock Spring Nature Trail, also site #10 on the North Alabama Birding Trail

Tennessee 
Milepost 385.9 Meriwether Lewis Monument and Grave Site
391.9 Fall Hallow Trail
401.4 Tobacco Farm and Old Trace Drive
404.7 Trail to Jackson Falls and Baker Bluff Overlook
438 Bridge at Birdsong Hollow

Exit list
Mileage based on physical mileposts along the parkway.

Gallery

See also 
Blue Ridge Parkway
Loveless Cafe

References

External links 

Federal Highway Administration's photo of the Natchez Trace Parkway Bridge

All-American Roads
Natchez Trace
United States federal parkways
Historic American Engineering Record in Mississippi
National Park Service areas in Alabama
National Park Service areas in Tennessee
National Park Service areas in Mississippi
Civilian Conservation Corps in Tennessee
Civilian Conservation Corps in Mississippi
Civilian Conservation Corps in Alabama
Protected areas of Adams County, Mississippi
Protected areas of Davidson County, Tennessee
Protected areas of Lee County, Mississippi
Protected areas of Hinds County, Mississippi
Tupelo, Mississippi
Protected areas of Madison County, Mississippi
Protected areas of Attala County, Mississippi
Protected areas of Chickasaw County, Mississippi
Protected areas of Choctaw County, Mississippi
Protected areas of Itawamba County, Mississippi
Protected areas of Jefferson County, Mississippi
Protected areas of Pontotoc County, Mississippi
Protected areas of Tishomingo County, Mississippi
Protected areas of Colbert County, Alabama
Protected areas of Wayne County, Tennessee
Protected areas of Lewis County, Tennessee
Protected areas of Lawrence County, Tennessee
Protected areas of Williamson County, Tennessee
Muscle Shoals National Heritage Area